Artax may refer to:

Artax, the horse belonging to the main character Atreyu in the children's fantasy novel The Neverending Story
Artax (horse), an American Champion Thoroughbred racehorse named after the fictional character
Nova Artax, an Austrian paraglider design